Cucullia santolinae is a moth of the family Noctuidae. It is found in southern Europe, northern Africa, Turkey, the Caucasus region and Israel.

Warren (1914) states : C. santolinae Rambur (= wredowi Costa) (27 c). Like lactucae Cucullia lactucae but smaller and with narrower wings; characterised by the whitish patch in the region of the stigmata and a whitish blotch between the inner and outer lines on submedian fold; veins and a submedian streak finely black; a curved dark streak below end
of cell represents the reniform stigma : a black streak above vein 4 and a shorter one below vein 2 before termen ;hindwing uniformly brown. A South European species found in S. France, Switzerland, Andalusia, Corsica, Italy and Algeria — Larva dirty green or reddish, with
some white spots representing the dorsal line; on each segment at the sides some violet streaks; venter pale with black wavy lines; head pale; feeds on Artemisia arborea.

Adults are on wing from December to January. There is one generation per year.

The larvae feed on the flowers and seeds of Artemisia arborea and Artemisia campestris. Host plants: larvae In the Levant they probably feed on Artemisia monosperma.

References

External links
Fauna Europaea
Lepiforum.de

Cucullia
Moths described in 1834
Moths of Asia
Moths of Europe
Moths of Africa
Taxa named by Jules Pierre Rambur